Jim or James Simons may refer to:
Jim Simons (mathematician) (born 1938), mathematician and hedge fund manager
Jim Simons (golfer) (1950–2005), American golfer
Jimmy Simons (born 1970), Dutch footballer
Jimmy Simons, co-winner of 2001 Primetime Emmy Award for Outstanding Comedy Series
James Simons, preceded by John Calhoun Sheppard as speaker of the South Carolina House of Representatives

See also
James Simmons (disambiguation)
James Simon (disambiguation)